An ace is a playing card.

Ace(s), ACE(S) and variants may also refer to:

Places
 Ace, ancient name of Acre, Israel
 Ace, Texas, United States, an unincorporated community
 ACE Basin, the estuaries of the Ashepoo, Combahee and Edisto Rivers in South Carolina, United States
 Aces (parish), Candamo, Spain
 Aces (river), a river of Asia

People and fictional characters
 Ace (name), includes people and fictional characters with the given name, nickname, surname, ring name or stage name
 Ace (musician), guitarist with Skunk Anansie
 Warren Furman, Ace from Gladiators

Arts, entertainment, and media

Awards
 ACE Awards (Award for Cable Excellence)
 New York Latin ACE Awards, an award for Latino achievement in entertainment

Comics
 Ace Comics, a 1937-1959 comic book series
 Ace Magazines (comics), a 1940-1956 a comic-book and pulp-magazine publishing company

Music

Groups
 Ace (band), a 1970s British rock group
 A.C.E (South Korean band), a South Korean boy group
 The Aces (blues band), a 1950s–1970s American group
 The Aces (indie pop band), a 2010s American group
 The Aces (Jamaican group), a 1965–1980s group, associated with Desmond Dekker
 The Aces (rock and roll band), a British group formed in the 1950s

Labels
 Ace Records (United Kingdom)
 Ace Records (United States)

Albums and songs
 Ace (Scooter album)
 Ace (Taemin EP)
 Ace (Ian Van Dahl album)
 Ace (Bob Weir album)
 Aces (album), by Suzy Bogguss
 "Aces" (song), by Suzy Bogguss

Video games
 Ace (video game), stylized as ACE, a 1985 flight simulator video game by Cascade Games
 A.C.E. Another Century's Episode, a 2005 video game for the PlayStation 2
 Ace Online, a flight-based online role-playing game

Other uses in arts, entertainment, and media
 Ace (musical) 2006
 ACE (games magazine)
 Ace (Wild Cards), a class of characters in the Wild Cards science fiction universe
 Ace Cinema, cinema in the London Borough of Harrow

Brands and enterprises
 Ace (brand), Latin American brand name for Tide detergent
 Ace Books, 1952–present, an American publisher of science fiction and fantasy 
 Ace Cinemas, an Australian cinema chain
 Ace Hardware, an American retailers' cooperative
 ACE Limited, a Swiss insurance company
 Ace Radio, an Australian company
 ACE Team, a Chilean video game company
 Ace Tone, a musical instrument company
 ACeS, a regional satellite-telecommunications company based in Jakarta, Indonesia
 Aces Studio, a former video game company
 Rockman Ace, a guitar amplifier in the Rockman series
 Action Computer Enterprise, a defunct microcomputer company
 Accelerated Christian Education, an educational products company
 Action Construction Equipment, an Indian company

Government
 ACE Electoral Knowledge Network, a web portal
 Agriculture in Concert with the Environment, a US Environmental Protection Agency program
 American Clean Energy and Security Act (2009)
 Automation of Central Excise and Service Tax (ACES), an alternative name for India's Central Excise Mission Mode Project

Military
 Ace (military)
 Flying ace, a military aviator credited with shooting down a set number of enemy aircraft
 Panzer ace, an ahistorical, popular culture term to describe successful German tank commanders
 Allied Command Europe, central command of NATO forces in Europe
 Aviation combat element, the air arm of the US Marines Air-Ground Task Force
 Galil ACE, an assault rifle
 HMS Ace (P414), a British submarine
 M9 Armored Combat Earthmover, a tracked vehicle
 United States Army Corps of Engineers

Organisations
 Alliance for Creativity and Entertainment
 Alliance of Confessing Evangelicals
 Alternatives for Community and Environment, a Boston environmental justice organization
 American Cinema Editors
 American Coaster Enthusiasts
 American College of Epidemiology
 American Copy Editors Society
 American Council on Education
 Animal Charity Evaluators
 Anime Contents Expo, a trade fair
 Arts Council England
 Association for Comparative Economic Studies
 Association for Consciousness Exploration
 Association for Consultancy and Engineering
 Association of European Film Archives and Cinematheques (French: Association des Cinémathèques Européennes)
 Association of Latin Entertainment Critics (Spanish: Asociación de Cronistas de Espectáculos de Nueva York)
 Assyria Council of Europe, a lobbying organization based in Brussels
 Astronaute Club Européen, a French space tourism association
 Australian College of Educators
 Auxiliary Campus Enterprises and Services, an organization at Alfred College, US

Education
 Alternative Center for Excellence, a school in Danbury, Connecticut, US
 Aviation Centre of Excellence, a department of Confederation College in Thunder Bay, Ontario, Canada

Science and technology

Aerospace
 Advanced Cryogenic Evolved Stage, a proposed rocket 2nd stage for ULA
 Advanced Composition Explorer, a NASA satellite
 Advanced Crew Escape Suit, an astronaut suit
 Atomic Clock Ensemble in Space, a European Space Agency project
 Atmospheric Chemistry Experiment, a project of the Canadian satellite SCISAT-1
 Asia Cellular Satellite system, a precursor of the Indonesian satellite company PT Pasifik Satelit Nusantara

Biology, chemistry, and healthcare
 A.C.E. mixture, an historical anesthetic
 Angiotensin-converting enzyme, a central component of the renin–angiotensin system (RAS), which controls blood pressure
 ACE inhibitor, a drug that lowers blood pressure
 Ace K, acesulfame potassium, an artificial sweetener
 ACE unit (Acute Care of Elderly), a type of hospital facility 
 Acepromazine, an antipsychotic drug used primarily in animals
 ACES (buffer), one of Good's buffers
 ACES (nutritional supplement), containing vitamins A, C, E and selenium
 Adverse childhood experiences
 Addenbrooke's Cognitive Examination

Computing
 ACE (compressed file format)
 Ace (editor), a code editor written in JavaScript
 ACE (editor), a desktop-based collaborative editor
 ACE (genomic file format)
 ACES (computational chemistry), a software package
 Access Control Entry, part of an access control list
 Acehnese language (ISO 639 code)
 Adaptive Communication Environment, an open-source network-programming framework
 Advanced Computerized Execution System, a stock-trading system
 Advanced Computing Environment, an early 1990s initiative for commodity computing hardware
 Adverse Childhood Experiences Study
 Agent-based computational economics
 Arbitrary code execution
 ASCII Compatible Encoding, a prefix related to internationalized domain names
 Asynchronous Compute Engine, a component defined in AMD's Graphics Core Next for ATI-type products
 Automatic Computing Engine, a 1952 British computer
 Automatic Content Extraction, an information-extraction technology-development program
 Jupiter Ace, a 1980s British computer

Other uses in science and technology
 Ace (quark model), an obsolete term for quark
 ACE (cable system), a submarine communications cable
 Academy Color Encoding System (ACES), a proposed color image encoding
 ACE experiment, the Antiproton Cell Experiment hosted at CERN
 Accumulated cyclone energy
 Aggregative Contingent Estimation, a program of the Intelligence Advanced Research Projects Agency
 Alternating conditional expectations, an algorithm in nonparametric regression.
 Alternative Chassis Engineering, a UK bus manufacturer, builder of the ACE Cougar
 Attempto Controlled English, a controlled natural language from the University of Zurich

Sports

Terminology
 Ace (baseball), a team's best starting pitcher
 Ace (golf), a hole in one
 Ace (pickleball), a serve that is not returned by the receiver
 Ace (tennis), a point won by the server without contest
 Ace formation, in American football

Teams
Alaska Aces (ECHL), an American ice hockey team
Alaska Aces (PBA), a Philippine basketball team
Alexandria Aces, a defunct American baseball team in Louisiana
Asheville Aces, a defunct American ice hockey team
Belle Vue Aces, an English motorcycle speedway team
Cornwall Aces, a Canadian ice hockey team playing 1993-1996
Dallas Aces, the world's first professional bridge team
Evansville Purple Aces, a college team of the University of Evansville
Las Vegas Aces, an American basketball team
Lower Merion High School Aces, the athletic teams at the school in suburban Philadelphia
Melbourne Aces, an Australian baseball team founded 2009
Northeast League Aces, a Canadian-American baseball team
Quebec Aces, a Canadian ice hockey team playing 1928-1971
Reno Aces, an American baseball team in Nevada
Victoria Aces, an Australian baseball team founded 1934

Transportation

Automotive
 Ace (1913 automobile), a 1912-1916 British car
 Ace (1920 automobile), a 1920-1922 American car
 AC Ace, a 1953-1963 English car
 Atlantic City Expressway, a New Jersey toll road which is the main route between Atlantic City and Philadelphia
 Tata Ace, an Indian mini-truck introduced 2005
 Ace Motor Corporation, a 1919–1927 American motorcycle company

Aviation
 Ace Aircraft Manufacturing Company
 ACE Aviation Holdings, former parent company of Air Canada
 ACES Colombia,  Aerolíneas Centrales de Colombia, a defunct airline
 Aircraft Engineering Corporation, now defunct
 Edel Ace, a South Korean paraglider design
 ACE, IATA code of Lanzarote Airport, Canary Islands, Spain

Rail
 Altamont Corridor Express, a California train service
 Atlantic City Express Service, a New York-New Jersey train service
 Atlantic Coast Express, an England train service
 Kintetsu 22600 series "Ace", a Japanese train type

Other uses
 Action for Climate Empowerment, a United Nations term
 Ace, a slang term for an asexual person
 Ace, a slang term for a close friend

See also

 
 
  (includes ACE)
  (includes ACES)
 Ace of aces (disambiguation)
  Ace1 (disambiguation)
 Ace 2 (disambiguation)